GR 11 is a long-distance footpath in the Île-de-France region of France. It is part of an extensive national network of rural hiking trails. It follows a circular route around Paris, going through the départements of Val d'Oise, Seine-et-Marne, Essonne and Yvelines. Towns passed through include Chantilly, Senlis, Fontainebleau, Provins, Mantes-la-Jolie and Chevreuse. The circle is much wider than that followed by the GR 1, which also rings Paris.

See also
GR footpath
European long-distance paths

External links
 GR11 From Senlis (Oise) to Signy-Signets (Seine-et-Marne)
 GR11 From Signy-Signets to Donnemarie-Dontilly (Seine-et-Marne)
 GR11 From Donnemarie-Dontilly (Seine-et-Marne) to Mondeville (Essonne)
 GR11 From Mondeville (Essonne) to Flexanville (Yvelines)
 GR11 From Flexanville (Yvelines) to Senlis (Oise)
 GR11 Tour of Paris in Ile de France region (Full itinerary)
 GR11 on Jan's Wondere Wandelwereld

Hiking trails in France